Grovania is an unincorporated community in Houston County, in the U.S. state of Georgia.

History
The community was named for groves of fruit trees near the original town site. A post office called Grovania was established in 1889, and remained in operation until 1952.

The Georgia General Assembly incorporated the place as the Town of Grovania in 1909. The town's municipal charter was dissolved in 1995.

References

Former municipalities in Georgia (U.S. state)
Unincorporated communities in Houston County, Georgia
Populated places disestablished in 1995
Unincorporated communities in Georgia (U.S. state)